Ishq-e-Laila is a 1957 Pakistani Urdu language fantasy romance film directed by Munshi Dil and produced by J.C. Anand. The film is primarily known for its blockbuster music by Safdar Hussain and lyrics by Qateel Shifai. It stars Sabiha Khanum, Santosh Kumar and Allaudin in the lead. In 2017, Lok Virsa Museum screened the film as part of special showcase of the feature films in the country.

It talks about Layla and Majnun, a tragic love story by Nizami Ganjavi. The film consists twelve to fourteen songs, leading it to become the first and the only film of the Pakistani film industry with maximum number of songs recorded till century. The filmmakers are argued to have introduced central character in an informal manner, leading it to create a discrepancy between the film story and the poem. During the filming process, the protagonist actor appeared well dressed with a good physical appearance, contradict to the two lovers of the poem who appears in a poor health condition due to distress events experienced during their relationship span.

Cast 
 Santosh Kumar as Qais, playing protagonist character of Majnun
 Sabiha Khanum as Laila, playing as central role in film as Majnun's lover
 Allauddin
 Asha Posley
 M. Ajmal

Crew 
 AH Rana Production Manager

Soundtrack

References

External links 

1957 films
1950s Urdu-language films
1950s musical drama films
Pakistani romantic drama films
Pakistani musical drama films
Films based on folklore
Films set in Pakistan
Films shot in Pakistan
Lollywood films
1957 drama films
1950s historical drama films
Urdu-language Pakistani films